The 1995 Campeonato de España de Turismos was won  by Luis Villamil with Alfa Romeo 155 TS.

Teams and drivers

Race calendar and results

Championship results

 17 results from 20 are valid for the championship

Drivers' Championship